Gamma Columbae, Latinized from γ Columbae, is a possible wide binary star system in the southern constellation of Columba. It is visible to the naked eye with an apparent visual magnitude of 4.36. Based upon an annual parallax shift of 3.75 mas, it is located roughly 870 light years from the Sun.

The primary component is an evolved B-type subgiant star with a stellar classification of B2.5 IV. The star has nearly six times the mass of the Sun and close to five times the Sun's girth. It is radiating over 2,000 times the solar luminosity from its outer atmosphere at an effective temperature of 12,904 K. The estimated age of this star is around 24 million years. At this age, it is thought to be the remnant of a once more massive star that just finished hydrogen fusion, and is undergoing structural readjustment. This process is extremely short, on the order of ten thousand years, making it a rare object.

The visual magnitude 12.664 companion is a G-type main sequence star with a classification of G8 V. It lies at an angular separation of 33.8 arc seconds from the primary, which corresponds to a projected physical separation of 8,844 AU. Despite the young age of these stars, there has been no X-ray emission detected.

References

External links

B-type subgiants
G-type main-sequence stars
Columbae, Gamma
Columba (constellation)
Durchmusterung objects
040494
028199
02106